A guerrilla is an individual or group engaged in irregular warfare and combat.

Guerrilla may also refer to:

Film and television
Guerrilla filmmaking, a form of independent filmmaking characterized by low budgets
Guerrilla, the subtitle for part two of the 2008 biopic Che about Che Guevara starring Benicio del Toro
Guerrilla (1985 film), a 1985 Indian Malayalam film
Guerrilla (2011 film), a Bangladeshi film about the Liberation war of Bangladesh
Guerrilla (TV series), a 2017 British drama
The Guerrilla, a 1908 silent film directed by D. W. Griffith
The Guerrilla (1973 film), a 1973 French-Spanish film

Music
Guerrilla gig, a type of concert performed in a non-traditional setting or arranged in an unusual fashion
Guerrilla (album), a 1999 album by Super Furry Animals
Guerilla Records, a British record label

Gaming
Red Faction: Guerrilla, a 2009 open world video game with destructible environment
Guerrilla Games, a Dutch video game developer

Other uses
Guerrillas (novel), a 1975 novel by V.S. Naipaul
Guerrilla communication, a method of intervening in the process of communication to provoke subversive effects
Guerrilla gardening, gardening on land that is not normally used for that
Guerrilla marketing, an unconventional system of promotions on a very low budget
Guerrilla diplomacy, a method of diplomacy and an alternative approach to international relations

See also
Guerrilla Unit
Guerrilla Warfare (disambiguation)
Gorilla Warfare (disambiguation)
Gorilla (disambiguation)